Su Shun (born 9 March 1994) is a Chinese footballer currently playing as a midfielder for Shaanxi Chang'an Athletic.

Career statistics

Club
.

References

1994 births
Living people
Footballers from Tianjin
Chinese footballers
Chinese expatriate footballers
Association football midfielders
China League Two players
Tianjin Jinmen Tiger F.C. players
Shanghai Shenhua F.C. players
F.C. Felgueiras 1932 players
Yunnan Flying Tigers F.C. players
Shaanxi Chang'an Athletic F.C. players
Chinese expatriate sportspeople in Spain
Expatriate footballers in Spain
Chinese expatriate sportspeople in Portugal
Expatriate footballers in Portugal
21st-century Chinese people